In baseball, the field manager (commonly referred to as the manager) is the equivalent of a head coach who is responsible for overseeing and making final decisions on all aspects of on-field team strategy, lineup selection, training and instruction. Managers are typically assisted by a staff of assistant coaches whose responsibilities are specialized. Field managers are typically not involved in off-field personnel decisions or long-term club planning, responsibilities that are instead held by a team's general manager.

Duties 
The manager chooses the batting order and starting pitcher before each game, and makes substitutions throughout the game – among the most significant being those decisions regarding when to bring in a relief pitcher. How much control a manager takes in a game's strategy varies from manager to manager and from game to game. Some managers control pitch selection, defensive positioning, decisions to bunt, steal, pitch out, etc., while others designate an assistant coach or a player (often the catcher) to make some or all of these decisions.

Some managers choose to act as their team's first base or third base coach while their team is batting in order to more closely communicate with baserunners, but most managers delegate this responsibility to an assistant. Managers are typically assisted by two or more coaches.

In professional baseball 
In many cases, a manager is a former professional, semi-professional or college player. A high proportion of current and former managers played the central position of catcher during their playing days, including Yogi Berra, Bruce Bochy, Wilbert Robinson, Joe Girardi, Mike Scioscia, Joe Torre, Connie Mack, Ralph Houk, and Ned Yost.

The manager's responsibilities normally are limited to in-game decisions, with off-field roster management and personnel decisions falling to the team's general manager. The term manager used without qualification almost always refers to the field manager (essentially equivalent to the head coach in other North American professional sports leagues), while the general manager is often called the GM. This usage dates back to the early days of professional baseball when it was common practice for teams to have just one "manager" on their staff, and where GM duties were performed either by the field manager or (more commonly) by the owner of the team. Some owners (most famously, Connie Mack of the Philadelphia Athletics) carried out both GM and field managerial duties themselves.

Major League Baseball managers differ from the head coaches of most other professional sports in that they dress in the same uniform as the players and are assigned a jersey number. The wearing of a matching uniform is frequently practiced at other levels of play, as well. The manager may be called "skipper" or "skip" informally by his players.

See also
Related topics
 Player-manager (baseball)
 American Baseball Coaches Association
Awards
 Major League Baseball Manager of the Year Award
 Sporting News Manager of the Year Award
 Honor Rolls of Baseball#Managers
Lists
 List of Major League Baseball managers
 List of Major League Baseball managers by wins
 List of Major League Baseball player-managers

External links 
 

 
 
 A
Baseball occupations
Baseball